The Tijdschrift voor Rechtsgeschiedenis/Revue d'Histoire du Droit/The Legal History Review is a quarterly peer-reviewed academic journal covering legal history. It was established in 1918 and is published by Brill Publishers.

Abstracting and indexing
The journal is abstracted and indexed in:
Arts & Humanities Citation Index
EBSCO databases
L'Année philologique
Modern Language Association Database
Scopus
Social Sciences Citation Index
According to the Journal Citation Reports, the journal has a 2017 impact factor of 0.114.

References

External links

Legal history journals
Quarterly journals
Multilingual journals
Dutch-language journals
English-language journals
French-language journals
German-language journals
Brill Publishers academic journals
Publications established in 1918